The Ixcatec people are a native ethnic minority in Mexico. There are a reported 207 of them living in the state of Oaxaca. 

Their traditional language is the Ixcatec language (Xwja) which is in danger of extinction.

The Ixcatec community is centered in Santa María Ixcatlán, which is within the Tehuacán-Cuicatlán Biosphere Reserve.

Ixcatec is an exonym. In Xwja, they are Xuani or Xula.

References

Ethnic groups in Mexico